Ahmed G. Cuizon is a media practitioner in Cebu Philippines.

He was the anchor of Sugbuanon Na Ni over Radio Station DYAB and A Contributing writer in Cebu's Newspaper . He started his broadcast career in 2003 with DYAB AM as a News and Public Affairs Host. A member of KBP Kapisanan ng mga Brodkaster ng Pilipinas
He wrote the History of Lapu-Lapu City for the Cebu Provincial History Project.

He was Public Affairs Manager of the Mactan Cebu International Airport

December 15, 2010 he was appointed by president Benigno Aquino III as the new director of the Land Transportation Franchising and Regulatory Board (Philippines) (LTFRB ) 7.

He is a Career Executive Service Officers.

Cuizon is gearing up to return to the Mactan Cebu International Airport Authority (MCIAA) as assistant general manager, he received an outstanding score from the Career Executive Performance Evaluation System (Cespes).

Cuizon got a Cespes final score of 6.55 for 2013.

Work History
Cuizon served the government through the following positions:

Division Manager C,Public Affairs Office, Mactan–Cebu International Airport Authority, April 2003 - December 2010
Senior Public Relations Officer, Public Affairs Office, Mactan–Cebu International Airport Authority, November 1996 – March 2003
Senior Planning Officer, Metro Cebu Development Project,  March 1996 – November 1996
Human Resource Management Officer, Metro Cebu Development Project, March 1992 – February 1996
Information Systems Analyst, Metro Cebu Development Project,  July 1991 – February 1992
Project Development Officer, Metro Cebu Development Project, January – June 1991
Public Information Officer,  Department of Public Works and Highways, Project Management Office – Manila,   July – December 1990
Senior Clerk, Philippine Information Agency – Region 7,  June 1990
Artist / Illustrator, Philippine Information Agency – Region 7, July 1989 – May 1990

Sources

External links
LTFRB Homepage

Living people
Filipino civil servants
Benigno Aquino III administration personnel
People from Cebu
Cebuano people
1965 births